Miscellaneous Mathematical Symbols-A is a Unicode block containing characters for mathematical, logical, and database notation.

Character table

Compact table

History
The following Unicode-related documents record the purpose and process of defining specific characters in the Miscellaneous Mathematical Symbols-A block:

See also 
 Mathematical operators and symbols in Unicode

References

Unicode blocks